Diane Szmiett (born September 17, 1990) is a Canadian former competitive figure skater. She placed tenth at the 2010 Four Continents Championships and won two medals on the ISU Junior Grand Prix series in 2008.

Career 
Szmiett began skating at age seven because her friend was a skater. After becoming the 2006 Canadian national junior champion, she was sent to the 2006 World Junior Championships, where she finished 21st. The following season, she began competing on the senior level nationally but remained a junior internationally.
 
In 2008, Szmiett won silver and bronze medals at her two JGP events in Courchevel, France and South Africa. She was assigned to the 2009 World Junior Championships and placed 13th.

In the 2009—10 season, Szmiett began competing as a senior internationally. She received one senior Grand Prix assignment, the 2009 Cup of China, where she finished eighth. After placing fourth at the Canadian Championships, she was sent to the 2010 Four Continents Championships where she finished tenth.

In 2010–11, Szmiett appeared at two Grand Prix events and retired from competition at the end of the season.

Programs

Competitive highlights
GP: Grand Prix; JGP: Junior Grand Prix

References

External links

 
 Diane Szmiett at Tracings.net

Canadian female single skaters
1990 births
Living people
Sportspeople from London, Ontario